Selfmindead was a  hardcore punk band from Sweden.

History 
Selfmindead formed in the winter of 1994–1995 in Eskilstuna, Sweden as a four-piece. Marko Hautakoski on drums, Timo Sillankorva on guitar, vocalist Ilkka Viitasalo and bassist Tapani Hoikkaniemi. Mostly influenced by the Swedish hardcore scene, bands such as Refused, Abhinanda, and Mindjive. In 1995 the band entered a competition in their hometown of Eskilstuna, known as Cult-95. After winning this competition they began to play more shows around Sweden. In 1996, Selfmindead came into contact with a newly formed record label known as Soulscape Records. They signed with Soulscape and released one 7", featuring two original songs and a cover of Starflyer 59's song, "Hazel Would". In the early summer of 1997 they entered the studio to record a self titled, full-length record. The album was released in Scandinavia by Soulscape, who had released their previous 7". It was distributed in England and Benelux by Sally Forth Records and in the US by Solid State Records. The group toured Europe behind this release.

The band went through a member change at this time, Tapani left and was replaced by Emil Nikolaisen of Royal, Silver, and later Serena Maneesh. In the late Summer of 1999, Selfmindead again entered the studio to begin work on their follow-up full length, At the Barricades We Fall. This album, like their previous release, was distributed in Scandinavia by Soulscape, in Europe by Sally Forth, and the US by Solidstate. During the writing process of "Barricades", Emil left to pursue other interests. Marko left his position as drummer and took up the guitar. Marko's previous place was filled by Tommy  (Silver, Turbonegro) and the empty bass position was filled by Even (Silver, Evil Eye). After touring as a five-piece, Even and Tommy left to work more on their Silver project. After this the band began to look for more permanent members and found Håkon from a band called "Mold" on bass and Michal from a broken up band called, "Amphibro". During this time the band rehearsed only once a month, due to Michal living over 700 km away. Eventually they began to tour again, mostly throughout Germany and Sweden.

A tour of the US followed in 2000, but due to complications, not all the members could make it to all the dates on this tour. A reserve system was put into place to solve this problem. Upon their return home they began the writing process for their third album. During this time they released a split EP with Dutch band The Spirit That Guides Us on Sally Forth which was distributed by Sony Music. The band played several festivals throughout Europe and played their last show at a club called "Blå" in their hometown of Eskilstuna in August 2002. The band finally called it quits on 22 March 2003, the same day Ilkka and Marco announced they formed a new band.

In 2003, Ilkka and Marco formed a new band in Norway known as Benea Reach and Timo started an electronic project known as Tiikeri.

The band in 2014, briefly reunited to play two shows in Norway with Mantric and Shevils. In 2016 the band was playing at Brainstorm Festival in the Netherlands on 12 November, with the lineup of Ilkka, Marco, Timo, Michal Bäckrud, and Håkon Sverre Nakken.

Members 
Current
Ilkka "Volume" Viitasalo – vocals (1994–2003, 2014, 2016–present) (Benea Reach)
Marko "Storm" Hautakoski – drums (1994–1999, 2002), guitar (1999–2003, 2014, 2016–present), backing vocals (1994–2003, 2014, 2016–present) (Benea Reach)
Timo Sillankorva – guitar (1994–2003, 2014, 2016–present)
Håkon Sverre Nakken – bass (1999–2003, 2014, 2016–present) (Benea Reach)
Michal Bäckrud- drums (1999–2003, 2014, 2016–present)

Former
Tapani Hoikkaniemi – bass (1994–1998)
Emil Nikolaisen (Extol, Serena Maneesh) – bass (1998–1999)

Live
Even Steven (Silver, Evil Eye) – bass (1999)
Tommy Akerholdt (Silver, Turbonegro) – drums (1999)
Ole Børud – guitar (2002) (Extol, Schaliach, Arnold B Family, Fleshkiller)

Timeline

Discography 
Selfmindead 7"  (Soulscape Records, 1997)
Selfmindead (Solid State Records, Sally Forth Records, 1998)
Hit's of the 80's (contributed "Wayfaring Stranger" to this compilation, Sally Forth Records, 2000)At the Barricades We Fall (Solid State Records, Sally Forth Records, 2000)The Oslo Compact'' (split with The Spirit That Guides Us, Sally Forth Records, 2001)

References

External links 

Swedish heavy metal musical groups
Christian hardcore musical groups
Musical groups established in 1994
Musical groups disestablished in 2003
Solid State Records artists